Carolina Place (also referred to as Carolina Place Mall) is a shopping mall located in Pineville, North Carolina, a suburb of Charlotte. The  GLA mall, in the shape of a curve, is anchored by Belk, a Dick's Sporting Goods and Golf Galaxy combo store, Dillard's, and JCPenney.

History
Carolina Place Mall was planned over 30 years before its opening in 1991, as the original location of SouthPark Mall. The Belk and Ivey's families bought the land for $8.5 million, but decided it was too far away from town. Ivey's eventually sold all the land to Belk after SouthPark was built, and in the mid 1980s the planning of Carolina Place, as it is known today, began.

The mall opened in 1991 with four anchor stores, Belk, Dillard's (Ivey's had just been bought by Dillard's), JCPenney and Sears. Several years previously, Belk closed its 75+ year-old store in uptown Charlotte, and JCPenney closed its 35-year-old store at Park Road Shopping Center. There were two more anchor pads available, one for Rich's and the other for Miller & Rhoads. However, neither of these stores joined the mall. In 1993, Hecht's (which had just bought Thalhimers) opened its doors as the 5th anchor store to the mall, making Carolina Place Mall the only mall in the region with 5 department store anchors at that time. In 1996, Incredible Universe and Garden Ridge opened outside the mall. In 1997, Incredible Universe closed and Sam's Club opened in its place. Garden Ridge became At Home in 2014.

The mall is managed by Brookfield Properties. Barnes & Noble, REI, and Harper's Restaurant joined the mall on its sixth anchor pad in an outdoor portion slated in August 2006. That same year, Hecht's was replaced by Macy's.

The second Charlotte area H&M opened its doors to the public on February 27, 2014.

Macy's closed in early 2017, following a sale of the store in an effort to improve profitability by reducing its brick-and-mortar footprint.

On October 15, 2018, it was announced that Sears would be closing as part of a plan to close 142 stores nationwide. The store closed in January 2019.

In May 2019, a Dick's Sporting Goods and Golf Galaxy combo store opened in the former Macy's.

External links
Carolina Place Mall

References

Shopping malls in Charlotte, North Carolina
Shopping malls established in 1991
Shopping malls in North Carolina
Brookfield Properties
1991 establishments in North Carolina